Sony mount may refer to:

Sony A-mount, a Minolta A-mount-compatible auto-focus lens mount for APS-C and full-frame digital SLR/SLT/ILCA cameras since 2006 (1985)
Sony E-mount, a lens mount for APS-C and full-frame (FE) digital mirrorless cameras since 2010
Sony FZ-mount, a lens mount for professional digital video cameras since 2010
Sony B4-mount, a lens mount for professional digital video cameras
Sony PL-mount, a lens mount for professional video cameras
Sony Mavica mount, two lens mounts for Mavica cameras between 1981 and 1992

See also
Zeiss A-mount (ZA)
Zeiss E-mount (ZA)
Hasselblad A-mount
Hasselblad E-mount
Konica Minolta A-mount
Minolta A-mount